Prince of Spain, was the title created on 22 July 1969 designated by law proclaiming Juan Carlos de Borbón as the successor of Francisco Franco. Juan Carlos held the title until 22 November 1975, when he became King of Spain following the death of Franco. The only person to hold this title was Juan Carlos; the title given to the heir-apparent or heir-presumptive to the Spanish throne has since been Prince of Asturias or Princess of Asturias.

The title was given the associated style of His Royal Highness and the military honors of the Captain General of the Army. The design of the coat of arms and the royal standard was regulated by decree on 22 April 1971 for the personal use by the Prince of Spain, not to be confused with an earlier hereditary confirmation by Joseph Bonaparte on his children and grandchildren.

See also
Law of Succession to the Headship of the State

References

External links
 Description of the Standard and Coat of arms of the Prince at Flags of the World

Francoist Spain
Heirs to the throne
Spain
Spain
Titles held only by one person
1969 establishments in Spain
1975 disestablishments in Spain
Juan Carlos I of Spain